MLC School (previously Methodist Ladies' College) is an independent Uniting Church single-sex early learning, primary, and secondary day school for girls, located in the inner western Sydney suburb of Burwood, New South Wales, Australia. The school enrols students from early learning, through kindergarten to year 12.

History 
MLC School was founded in 1886 to prepare students for entrance to the University of Sydney, which had only admitted women to degrees four years before. With the view that much more could be expected of girls’ skills and talents during their school education, MLC School was one of the first schools in Australia to offer girls the same level of education as boys.

In 1889, a kindergarten was introduced, placing MLC School in the forefront of educational practice. Founding principal Charles John Prescott believed in the education of very young children and persuaded the college council to establish a co-educational kindergarten. It is believed that MLC School was one of the first to establish a purpose-built kindergarten building. In 1890, Miss Scheer became the MLC School kindergarten teacher. Scheer had received her training in Germany in the methods developed by Friedrich Fröbel.

MLC School has a long tradition in science education. The school's first science laboratory was built in 1924 and chemistry and physics were promptly added to the curriculum. MLC School became the first school in the state to present girls for the Leaving Certificate in physics.

MLC School was also a boarding school until 1977, when a fire destroyed the sleeping dormitories, dining room, offices and some classrooms. When assessed, it was decided that a significant portion of the affected buildings would have to be demolished. Due to falling demand for boarding accommodation, the school council decided not to rebuild the boarding quarters and to phase out the boarding school, which closed at the end of 1979.

In June 1977, when the Methodist Church was incorporated into the new union of the Methodist, Presbyterian and Congregational Churches, the Methodist Ladies College Burwood became known officially as MLC School. Today, MLC School is a day school that forms part of the Uniting Church of Australia.

Name changes

 1886 – Wesleyan Ladies' College (opens on 27 January 1986)
 1899 – Burwood Ladies' College
 1914 – Methodist Ladies' College
 1977 – MLC School

School crest, colours and motto 

In 1886, founding principal Prescott and MLC School's drawing and painting teacher Miss Douglas designed the MLC School crest. The crest depicts the book of learning and the star of knowledge on the cross of Saint George.

The MLC School motto, chosen by Prescott, is from the Vulgate: Ut filiae lucis ambulate – ‘Walk as daughters of the light’.

Prescott also chose the MLC School colours to honour his alma mater Oxford and its rival institution Cambridge: two bands of dark blue (for love of Oxford) with light blue inserted (for love of Cambridge).

School song

The MLC School song is "Here in This House", with music by Australian composer Lindley Evans (who was a visiting music teacher at MLC School from 1930 to 1946) to lyrics by poet laureate John Masefield.

Recent developments

A number of recent facilities at the school have been designed and constructed by architects Ed Lippmann and Associates, starting with the MLC School Aquatic Centre, which was opened by Dawn Fraser in 2003. The Junior School was completed and opened in 2009 by the Governor-General of Australia Quentin Bryce.  The facilities available in the junior school include flexible learning spaces, learning studios, small group areas, wet areas, a literature and resource hub, outdoor learning and play spaces, the piazza, the kiss and drop, and the welcome wall.

MLC Burwood, particularly the main school site bounded by Rowley and Grantham Street and Park Road, is listed on the local government heritage register.

Principals 
From 1886 to 1972, MLC School operated under a dual control system with the principal connecting the school to the church and performing religious instruction, and the headmistress administering the day-to-day running, general education and discipline. In 1972 the system changed to single control with the Principal overseeing all the leadership duties. MLC School's principal is Lisa Moloney.

Curriculum

Higher School Certificate (HSC) 
MLC School is registered and accredited with the New South Wales Board of Studies, and therefore follows the mandated curriculum for all years. In Year 12, the Higher School Certificate (HSC) or the International Baccalaureate (IB) curriculum are followed.

International Baccalaureate (IB) 
MLC became an IB World School in August 1999 and offers the International Baccalaureate (IB) to all students in Years 11 and 12 as an alternative to the HSC.

Students undertaking the International Baccalaureate Diploma Programme in their final two years at school select one subject from each of six core study areas, ensuring a breadth of subject choice through humanities, experimental sciences, mathematics, arts and compulsory language study. The IB Diploma also requires a CAS component (hours dedicated to creativity, action and service), Theory of Knowledge classes and an Extended (5,000 word) Essay in a subject area of the student's choice.

The International Baccalaureate is offered as an international / global alternative to the NSW Higher School Certificate. It has been offered at MLC School since 2001 and is chosen by 30% of MLC School's graduates.
MLC School's 2010 IB Diploma results included four perfect scores, converting to the maximum Australian Tertiary Admissions Rank (ATAR) of 99.95. The School's IB Diploma median rank was 98.80.
The combined 2010 HSC and IB Diploma scores also resulted in 55% of candidates receiving an ATAR of 90.00 or above, with 14 candidates scoring 99.00 or above.

Co-curriculum

Sport 
Primary school students may partake in competitive sport through MLC School's membership of the Junior School Heads Association of Australia (JSHAA). These competitions are usually held on Saturday mornings and include sports such as: tee-ball/softball, tennis, netball, cricket, minkey/hockey and soccer. 
 
Secondary school students compete against 28 other similar type schools in the Independent Girls' Schools Sporting Association (IGSSA) competition. These competitions occur on Saturday mornings or in the form of carnivals and include sports such as: netball, softball, swimming, diving, cricket, tennis, athletics, fencing, cross country, rowing, hockey, soccer, water polo, basketball, touch football and gymnastics.

Students who perform well at JSHAA or IGSSA level may be invited to compete in NSW Combined Independent Schools' (CIS) competitions.

From its inception, MLC School has valued academic and co-curricular achievements equally. MLC School was the first school to give girls equal access to sports when on 3 November 1906 the first Athletics Sports Carnival for girls in Australia was held at MLC School. 
“At first other schools seemed to wonder if it was quite the correct thing, but next year some of them followed suit, and eventually all who had held up hands of horror, put them down and joined in too.”

Music 
MLC School offers instrumental music lessons in over twenty instruments to both current MLC students and external students. Lessons are conducted by professional musicians. Students interested in music are offered the opportunity to perform on a number of levels, including at studio concerts and smaller groups. Performance opportunities are available every year in the Sydney Town Hall and biennially at the Sydney Opera House.

From the beginning, music has held a special status at MLC School. The school's founding principal Prescott wanted his students to achieve tangible recognition for their achievements through examinations in music theory. MLC School was integral in the establishment of the Trinity College (London) musical theory examinations in Australia – the first board to examine candidates in music in Australia. The first MLC School Trinity College results are noted in the School's Examination Results in 1887, just one year after the School was established.

Dance 

In 2008, MLC School won the Rock Eisteddfod Challenge NSW Open Division with a performance titled 'The Shades of Grief'; a story about the Beaumont children who went missing from a beach in Adelaide and have never been found. They won eight awards at the heats and another eight awards at the finals plus the overall 1st place.

In 2009, MLC School was a grand finalist in the Rock Eisteddfod Challenge NSW Premier Division; their performance titled 'The Private Life of a Masterpiece' depicted the story of Edgar Degas' sculpture 'Little Dancer of Fourteen Years'.

In 2011, MLC School won the Rock Eisteddfod Challenge NSW Premier Division with an entry entitled 'Granville'; a highly sophisticated and emotional piece that recalls the circumstances of how the Granville Train Disaster occurred and then explores how the accident impacted on Sydney's Western Suburbs. They also had previously won the NSW Regional Championships with the piece, winning nine awards to take 1st place at the Wollongong event.

In 2019, MLC School competed in the Wakakirri Secondary School Story Dance Challenge with the piece 'The Price of Low Cost', following the story of a catastrophic sweatshop fire in Bangladesh. The performance was nominated for the National Story of the Year Award and placed 2nd.

House system

MLC School's senior school has ten houses. Four were created in 1942, and the other six were added in 1992.
MLC School's primary school still utilises the original four houses.

Each House has a staff Head of House and House Tutors. Spirited inter-House competition takes place every year as Houses vie for honours in debating, chess, literature, athletics, cross-country racing and swimming to take out the Spirit and Points Trophies on Speech Night at the end of the year.

Original house names (1942) 

The first four houses were established by Headmistress Dr Gladys Wade in 1942. The House names were chosen from Aboriginal words commencing with the letters MLCB to fit the first letters of Methodist Ladies’ College Burwood, and their emblems were drawn from the MLC School Crest.
Mooramoora means "good spirit", its emblem is the book and its colour is light green (emerald) representing initiative.
Churunga means "sacred place or thing", its emblem is the cross and its colour is yellow (gold) representing worship.
Leawarra means "uprising", its emblem is the shield and its colour is purple (violet) representing conviction.
Booralee means "an ideal to which we must aspire", its emblem is the star and its colour is red (scarlet) representing chivalry.

These house colours, when combined with the indigo and light blue of the school colours, create white light, which echoes the school motto: "Walk as daughters of the light".

Six additional houses (1992) 

In MLC School's 1986 centenary history Walk in the Light, G. Wade (in 1942) described the aims of the original house system as: “giving students interests wider than those of their own class or age group and creating a greater feeling of belonging to the school as a whole. It also allowed more students to become involved in organising and decision making... The system would permeate almost every aspect of school life, providing a basis for friendly, but nevertheless intense competition”.

As the school population grew, Wade's vision began to erode as each of the four Houses grew to over 200 students. At this level, the house system had little meaning other than as a convenient way of dividing the school for sporting and debating competitions.

In 1992, the addition of six new houses was an attempt to restore the system to its original intent. Expanding the house system strengthened the pastoral care program, and provided students with more leadership opportunities and greater encouragement for participation in the wider life of the school.

With ten houses, each student was able to operate within a unit of about eighty students and participation becomes a necessity rather than an option. The impact of this was immediately evident with greater involvement in swimming, sports and gymnastics competitions held during Term 4 1992.

New house names (1992) 

The six new houses introduced in 1992 were named after people and places of significance in the history of MLC School.

 Abbeythorpe was a two-storey Italianate building located across Park Road from the school, between the sports field and Burwood Park (where the 2003 Aquatic Centre now sits), where classes were held and early boarders were housed for almost 50 years from 1923 when it was purchased by the College Council. Abbeythorpe was demolished in 1972, and in 1978 the Gymnasium (still located within the Aquatic Centre) was built on the site.
 The colour for Abbeythorpe is dark green.

 Lester: One of the earliest private colleges for girls was run by Sarah Eliza Lester.
 In 1879 she established a ladies college (her fifth) in the 1855-built "Kent House" on the corner of Park Road and Rowley Street, Burwood. This became the Wesleyan Ladies’ College in 1886, then Burwood Ladies’ College in 1899, Methodist Ladies’ College in 1914, and MLC School in 1977.
 The colour of Lester House is orange.

 Prescott is named after the founder and first principal-headmaster of the Wesleyan Ladies’ College, Charles Prescott.
 In the seven weeks from the time he was offered the position of Headmaster, Prescott had, almost single-handed, organised the school into existence, and he stayed for 14 years during which the school gained a reputation for sound academic teaching and fine examination records in both academia and music. He left to become the headmaster of Newington College at the end of 1899.
 The colour of Prescott is royal blue.

 Sutton: Mabel Sutton, an MLC School old girl (cohort approx 1896) joined the staff of Burwood Ladies’ College as first assistant in 1910 and was appointed headmistress in 1912. In 28 years she left her mark on education both at the school and in the community. She retired in 1940.
 In the 1920s she was instrumental in introducing physics to the MLC School curriculum, thus making MLC School the first school in NSW to have girls sit the Leaving Certificate physics exams.
 The colour for Sutton is pink.

 Wade: Gladys Irene Wade was headmistress of MLC School from 1941 until 1959. Earlier in her academic and teaching career she had been a form mistress at MLC School (1918–24). Wade instigated many of the traditions of the school such as the house system and the school community service.
 The colour for Wade is turquoise (blue-green).

 Whitley: Alice Whitley was MLC School's last headmistress from 1960 to 1972. A former student of MLC School (Dux in 1930), Whitley made a lasting contribution to science education across NSW. Altogether, she devoted over 50 years of her life to the school. 
 The colour for Whitley is maroon.

Early MLC School architecture

Miss Lester’s Kent House

Sarah Eliza Lester moved her ladies’ college (for the fifth and last time prior to her retirement in 1885 when she moved across the road to 47 Park Road) to a large two-storey house on the Park Road / Rowley Street corner called ‘Kent House’ which stood on part of the ‘Burwood’ estate of 750 acres granted to Thomas Rowley by Governor John Hunter in 1799. (Until 1886, Park Road was known as River View Terrace and Rowley Street was known as Rowley Place.)

The Kent House estate consisted of 2.5 acres, about 1 acre being grassland on the opposite side of Park Road from the school. (Separating this field from Burwood Park was ‘Abbeythorpe’ which was built by the Starling family in the mid 1800s and acquired by the school in 1923 to be used as the Junior School.)

On 22 May 1885, the Wesleyan Conference Committee considered Lester's school at the Park/Rowley corner as a possible site for the Wesleyan Ladies College that they wished to establish to complement Newington College.

The main building consisted of four ground floor rooms and several bedrooms upstairs. A cottage (where Schofield Hall / the Chapel now stands), a stable, a coach house, a fowl house and a paddock on the other side of Park Road were included, bringing the area of purchase to one hectare. The Sydney Morning Herald advertisement on the 23 January 1886 stated that “the premises (Kent House) have been occupied as a school by Miss Lester for many years past and are consequently well-known.”

Schofield Hall (now MLC School Chapel)

As student numbers rose, plans were made for a significant extension to the buildings. The Kent House cottage, which had been used mainly for sleeping accommodation, was to be demolished and replaced with a two-storey building with dining hall and suite of bedrooms above.

The early days of MLC School were plagued by financial problems. Unlike other schools at the time, it had not started with a personal endowment. Prescott appealed for donations, stating that the school “started in faith, perhaps in the hope that some generous friend might come forward and do something to lighten the debt incurred by the buying of the College.”

The first ‘generous friend’ was Ellen Schofield, the wealthy widow of W. Schofield, a Wesleyan minister. Schofield provided the sum of £2,000 (approx $1 million in today's money) to the new Wesleyan Ladies College (as MLC School was then known), to build the Boarder's dormitory hall and dining room.

The new Boarder's dormitory hall and dining room (foundation stone laid in 1891) was named Schofield Hall. It was designed by Harry C. Kent (a leading Sydney architect who was President of the NSW Institute of Architects for two terms) who also made provision for two towers. Years later Schofield donated another £800 towards the construction of the northern Tower Wing.

In 1977 a fire destroyed the upstairs sleeping dormitory of Schofield Hall. The ground floor survived and is now the MLC School Chapel.

Tower Wing

The Tower Wing (foundation stone laid 1918) was designed by Alfred Newman in a Tudor Gothic style to harmonise with the existing architecture of the Schofield Hall which it adjoins.
A prominent feature in the new building was the large tower, 24 feet square, and four stories in height. This tower, which was fitted as the residence of the Principal, was covered with a flat roof that was utilised as a promenade.

The Tower Wing provided four additional large classrooms and eight music rooms, as well as bedrooms and sleeping-out balconies for the staff and boarders. Provision was also made for servants’ quarters, and ample shower and other facilities.

The Tower Wing once extended the length of what is now the Cornwell Building. Most of it was demolished in 1989 to make way for the Cornwell Building. Remaining from the original structure are the Tower, Sutherland Rooms and Deputy Principal's office.

Abbeythorpe

In late 1923 Abbeythorpe, a residence that stood between the school's playing fields and Burwood Park, was purchased from Mrs Starling. Abbeythorpe was used from 1924 for the kindergarten and primary classes with accommodation for Boarders on the upper floor. The property not only had a large two storey Victorian Italianate house, but also contained a small tennis court.

It had four classes, two on the ground floor and two on the second floor. It had not been renovated to look like a school though, the original rooms just had desks placed in them and a blackboard installed at the front.

Abbeythorpe was demolished in 1972, and in 1978 the Gymnasium (still located within the Aquatic Centre) was built on the site.

Potts Hall

By 1925 the growth in student numbers made it clear that a new hall was desperately needed. It was resolved to go ahead and build a new hall on the site of the original kindergarten building on the corner of Rowley and Grantham Streets.

The new block was to have a tower to balance the Tower Wing and was to incorporate a gymnasium and art room as well as new classrooms. The building was opened in June 1926 complete with hall which seated 1,000 people.

The gym on the ground floor was fitted out with money raised at a fete in the previous year. Funds raised by the Old Girls’ Union provided furnishings for the new Hall.

Initially called the Assembly Hall, the building was renamed Potts Hall in 1933 on Potts’ death.

First Swimming Pool

On 29 April 1929 the Parents’ and Friends’ Association was established with the objective of assisting in “any way possible the promotion of the interests of the College, and to supplement school equipment”. The original members chose as their first objective “the provision of a swimming pool in the College grounds”.

The Great Depression and WWII meant that fund raising was a challenge, but on 9 March 1957 the P&F had their “fulfilment of a dream” and the first MLC School pool was officially opened.

Kent House (Art and Design Centre)

In August 1949 a two-storey house, Youngarra, located on the corner of Rowley and Gordon Streets was purchased by the school. Youngarra contained fourteen rooms on a quarter of a hectare of much needed land. The building was renamed Kent House, in memory of the original school building. It was occupied by the kindergarten and lower primary school.

Youngarra was demolished in 1966 and replaced by a new and larger building which brought all the kindergarten and primary school under the one roof. This was to become the third building on MLC School premises to be named Kent House. In 2009 when the junior school relocated to its new premises on Park Road and Kent House became the MLC School Art and Design Centre.

Sutton House

In 1936 Cartreff, a two-story house at 36 Grantham Street was purchased and rename Sutton House in honour of the former student and long standing Headmistress, Mabel Sutton. It was to provide additional classrooms and was purchased with a view to future development.

In 1949 the grand Sutton House was completed. Its first floor housed the contents of the former Fiction and Reference Libraries. The new combined library retained the name Wearne Library (in memory of the former MLC School headmistress, Minnie Wearne), and for the first time a full-time trained Librarian was employed. It occupied most of the first floor of Sutton House and contained shelving for 8,000 books.

The construction of the new Sutton House also provide new science laboratories, a geography room and two senior rooms. The new ‘Wearne Library’ was noted for its simple and light finishes and spaces and was for use of the entire school. The Old Girls’ Union had donated the furniture.

In 1962 extensions to Sutton House were made at a right angle to Sutton House along the then northern boundary of the school.

Wade House

The tennis court on Grantham Street between Potts Hall and Sutton Hall was replaced by Wade House in 1961, a modern two storey brick building which featured façade panels highlighting the architectural fashion of the day. The building was noted for its contemporary internal finishes and provided a bright and roomy art room, five large classrooms on the first floor as well as several smaller rooms, domestic science and well appointed staff room on the ground floor.

Music education

Charles Prescott

Since the very early days, music has held a special status at MLC School – music's importance was such that, even when the school was conspicuously successful in academic examinations, the results of music exams always took precedence in the annual Speech Day reports.

From the beginning, music has held a special status at MLC School; music's importance was such that, even when the school was conspicuously successful in academic examinations, the results of music exams always took precedence in the annual Speech Day reports. The School's Founding Principal, Rev. Prescott wanted his students to achieve tangible recognition for their achievements through examinations in music theory. MLC School was integral in the establishment of the Trinity College (London) musical theory examinations in Australia – the first board to examine candidates in music in Australia. The first MLC School Trinity College results are noted in the School's Examination Results in 1887, just one year after the School was established.

With Prescott's encouragement, MLC School students entered various music grades in the Trinity College Theory Examinations. Practical examinations were administered by the Trinity, Sydney and Australian Colleges of Music. In addition, examiners were sent to the School from the Associated Board of the Royal Academy and the Royal College of Music in London.

Frederick Morley

One of Prescott's first staff appointments was Frederick Morley who remained as music and singing master at MLC School for forty years.

Development of MLC School orchestras

The first MLC School String Ensemble was formed in 1904 and was immediately popular. To meet the growing demand for music lessons, a wooden building was erected in 1905 to house three music rooms. Further facilities were provided with the 1919 opening of the Tower Wing where eight rooms were designated exclusively for music.

By 1912 music became a qualifying subject in the MLC School curriculum. Music standards grew, along with student numbers, elevating the general status of music in the School even more.

In 1932 the first MLC School Orchestra performed folk dances on senior play day. The Orchestra consisted of one first violin, four second violins, a cello, piano, two drums, four triangles, two cymbals and one tambourine.

The first MLC School concert was held in 1933 and featured items by the Senior and Junior Choirs as well as instrumental and recitation solos. The School magazine ‘Excelsior’ published a School music column from 1930 which featured competition results and reported on musical functions including lunchtime recitals, visitors’ recitals and gramophone lecture recitals.

By 1939 all girls were learning music in one form or another and the School Orchestra had grown to 16 musicians. Of the 90 girls who sat for various music grades within the Conservatorium of Music Examinations, 50 passed at either Credit or Honour standard, a highly commendable result for any school.

In 1942 the Senior Choir and Orchestra participated in the All Schools’ Music Festival held at the Sydney Conservatorium of Music and percussion band training was introduced in the Primary School.

Lindley Evans

Lindley Evans, a visiting member of the MLC School music staff from 1930 to 1946 (also Dame Nellie Melba's accompanist for several years) became a driving force in the development of music at the school. He helped MLC School win the fabled Demster Shield in his first year on staff in 1930, a feat repeated on other occasions in the 1930s before interest in the competition waned in the early 1940s. The spirit of Lindley Evans remained an integral part of MLC School's musical tradition. This was demonstrated at the 1969 Speech Night when the orchestra played a piece specially written by Frank Hutchens, who was a close associate of Lindley Evans’ for 40 years. Another lasting contribution that Lindley Evans made to MLC School was the composition of the music for the School song to lyrics by Poet Laureate John Masefield.

Sylvia Lew

In 1948 Sylvia Lew came to MLC School when her husband, Robert Lew, took over as principal after Deane's retirement. Having received musical training at the Sydney Conservatorium, she put her skills to good use by forming a 90-strong Boarders’ Choir within a year of coming to the School. In May 1952, the Boarders’ Choir received wide exposure when they were was broadcast by the Australian Broadcasting Commission. 
In recognition of Silvia Lew's contribution to MLC School's music tradition, the auditorium in the 1987 Centenary Music Centre was named in her honour. Other facilities in the Music Centre include a keyboard laboratory along with staff areas, music tuition and practice rooms.

Ken Cornwell
In the 1970s, the new principal of MLC School, Ken Cornwell, the son of musical parents, and who was himself an accomplished violinist, brought to the school a love of and commitment to music that has been strongly reflected in its subsequent curriculum development.

Between 1974 and 1985 the School's Music Department increased from 10 to 16 staff to become the largest single department in the school. An orchestra was formed in the Primary School in 1983, and the formation of recorder and Junior choir groups was followed in 1984 by Junior and Senior string ensembles. A highlight of the School calendar was the Annual Musical Evening held in July where performances included sixteenth century compositions as well as modern original items.

First Opera House concert in 1986

During its centenary year, MLC School performed a ‘Grand Concert’ at the Sydney Opera House initiated by Helen Watson who was the Head of Music at the time. This was billed as an ‘evening of serious music featuring soloists, choirs and orchestra’ and the performance was a magnificent feast of music, both orchestral and choral, and included performances from Old Girls who returned to join current students.

Music for all students

The development of music now incorporates an integrated development program to include girls from Kindergarten to Year 12. At the MLC Junior School, all primary girls participate in class music which develops performance, listening, aural and creative skills. Each girl has the opportunity to learn an orchestral instrument in a class situation as well as through individual tuition.

In the Senior School the music program focuses on learning generated by creative expression. The composition process taught from Year 7 progresses in elective classes where the girls develop skills to compose music for a variety of ensembles. Students are required to perform individually as well as being involved in ensemble performances.

Music events on the MLC School calendar

The musical highlight of each year is the MLC School Music Awards night held at the Sydney Town Hall.

The school's musical calendar also includes the biennial concert held in the Sydney Opera House initiated by Helen Watson in 1986 and continued by her successor, Karen Carey. These concerts display the School's musical standard. Orchestral, choral and ensemble performances by the entire School, its bands, choirs and ensembles are supplemented by excellent individual performances. The concerts routinely featured works by traditional composers such as Bach, Handel, Liszt, Saint-Saens, Schubert and Shostakovich. In addition, composition diversity is provided by performances of original works by the School's composer in residence, teachers and MLC School students.

Notable alumnae

Entertainment, media and the arts
 Angela Catterns – media personality and broadcaster
 Olive Cotton – modernist photographer
 Grace Crowley – modernist painter 
 Hazel de Berg  – oral history pioneer
 Helen Joyce Haenke – poet and playwright
 Emma Jones – award-winning poet
 Vimala Raman – Indian actress
 Lulu Shorter – china-painter
 Nikki Webster- singer
Medicine and science
 Phyllis Margery Anderson – pathologist
 Freida Ruth Heighway – gynaecologist
  Emeritus Professor Jane Latimer .
 Susie O'Reilly – pioneering female Australian doctor 
 Joyce Winifred Vickery  – forensic botanist

Politics and the law
 Natalie Bennett – Leader of the Green Party of England and Wales
 Megan Latham – Judge of the Supreme Court of New South Wales, Commissioner of ICAC (2014–2016)
 Marise Payne – Liberal Senator for New South Wales and former Minister for Foreign Affairs
 Mahla Pearlman – Chief Judge of the NSW Land and Environment Court from 1992 to 2003, and was the first woman chief judge in any State jurisdiction in Australia

Sport
 Jessica Ashwood – Olympic Games representative in swimming
Vanessa Baker – Commonwealth and Olympic Games diver
 Elisa Barnard – Olympic Games representative in archery
Penelope Blackmore – Commonwealth Games and Olympic Games rhythmic gymnast
 Lorraine Crapp – Olympic diver and swimmer
 Felicity Galvez – Olympic swimmer
 Taniele Gofers – Member of Olympics and National Women's waterpolo team
 Elizabeth Kell – Olympic rower and 2006 Rowing World Champion 
 Alyssa Healy - cricketer

See also 

 List of non-government schools in New South Wales

References

External links 
  for MLC School
 MLC School Annual Report 2006 (accessed:17 July 2007)

APRA Award winners
Girls' schools in New South Wales
Educational institutions established in 1886
Uniting Church schools in Australia
Former boarding schools in New South Wales
Former Methodist schools in Australia
Round Square schools
Rock Eisteddfod Challenge participants
Association of Heads of Independent Girls' Schools
Junior School Heads Association of Australia Member Schools
Private secondary schools in Sydney
Private primary schools in Sydney
International Baccalaureate schools in Australia
1886 establishments in Australia
Burwood, New South Wales
Alliance of Girls' Schools Australasia